The Cippus Perusinus is a stone tablet (cippus) discovered on the hill of San Marco, near Perugia, Italy, in 1822. The tablet bears 46 lines of incised Etruscan text, about 130 words. The cippus is assumed to be a text dedicating a legal contract between the Etruscan families of Velthina (from Perugia) and Afuna (from Chiusi), regarding the sharing or use of a property upon which there was a tomb belonging to the noble Velthinas.

The date of the inscription is considered to be 3rd or 2nd century BC. The Cippus is conserved in the National Archeological Museum of Perugia.

Original text

Formatted according to latest theory by F. Roncalli for the original lines, distorted when they were copied onto this stone. There are no capital letters in the original, but known and certain names are capitalized below. Lines in parentheses are those of the actual cippus. Word spacing is mostly hypothetical.

Front:

(1) eurat . tanna . Larezul /(2) ame  vaχr lautn .
Velθinaś e/(3)śtla Afunas slel eθ caru/
(4) tezan fuśleri tesnśteiś /(5) raśneś ipa ama
hen naper /(6) XII ( twelve )  Velθinaθuraś araś pe/(7)raśc
emulm lescul zu ci en/(8)es ci epl tularu/

(9) Aulesi Velθinas Arznal cl/(10)ensi . θii . θil
ścuna . cenu e/(11)plc felic Larθalś Afuneś/

(13!) falaś χiem fuśle Velθina /(12!)clen θunχulθe/
 (14) hinθa cape municlet masu / (15) naper śran czl
θii falaśt V/(16)elθina hut naper pen ezś/ 
(17) masu acnina . clel . Afuna Vel/(18)θina mler 
zinia inte mame/(19)r cnl Velθina zia śatene/

(20) tesne eca Velθina θuraś θ/(21)aura helu
tesne raśne cei /(22) tesnś teiś raśneś
χimθ śp/(23)el θuta ścuna Afuna mena /(24) hen
naper ci cnl hare utuśe /...

Side:

(25)...Velθina ś/(26)atena 
zuc/(27)i enesci. i/(28)pa. śpelane/(29)θi. fulumχ/(30)va. 
śpelθi. /(31) reneθi. eśt/(32)ac Velθina /(34) acilune. 
turune. śc/(35)une. zea. zuc/(36)i. enesci. aθ/(37)umicś. 
Afu/(38)naś. penθn/(39)a. ama. Velθ/(40)ina. Afun(a) /(41) 
θuruni. ein /(42) zeri una. cl/(43)a. θil. θunχ/(44)ulθl.
iχ. ca /(45) ceχa. ziχuχ/(46)e

Notes: The last word in the text, ziχuχe means 'was written.'  In line 10, θi-i and θi-l are respectively dative/instrumental and genitive for "water," and according to Facchetti (and approved by Wylin) the form cenu means "(is) obtained." Wylin translastes the phrase (9-11) Aulesi Velθinas Arznal clensi/ θii θil ścuna cenu e/pl-c feli-c Larθal-ś Afun-e  as "‘With respect to the water of Aule Velthina, son of Arznei, the use (ścuna) of water is obtained bothepl and feli by Larth Afuna." And Wylin points out that the tricolon in lines 33-34 acilune. turune. ścune probably corresponds to the Latin legal phrase facere, dare, praestare "to do, to give, and to make good," a phrase used with respect to personal obligations rather than legal rights."
 

Some phrases identified and partly translated by van Heems include: (1-2) eurat tanna larezul ame --"Larezul is the arbitrator tanna (of what follows?)"; (2-3) vaχr lautn Velθinaś eśtla Afunas slel eθ caru -- "An agreement of the Velthina tribe with that of Afuna, by his own (accord) was concluded (car-u ?)"; (3-5) tezan fuśle-ri tesnś-teiś raśneś -- "Complying (tezan ?) to the ordinances (fuśle-ri ?) from the public/Etruscan law"; (5-7) ipa ama hen naper XII Velθina-θur-aś araś peraś-c -- "that 12 hen (arable?) acres of Velthinas shall be dedicated and pera -ed." (18-21) inte mamer cnl Velθina zia śatene tesne, eca Velθina θuraś θaura helu --"To the (tomb) which Velthina zi-ed on the mamer according to the satena law, this has been hel -ed as the tomb of Velthina". (36-46)aθumicś Afunaś. penθna. ama. Velθina. Afuna θuruni. ein zeriuna. cla. θil. θunχulθl. iχ. ca ceχa. ziχuχe -- "The cippus of Afuna is aθumicś. Velthina (and) Afuna together (θuruni ?) shall not zerina (violate?) the accord concernting the water (rights), as this is written above."

See also
 Tyrrhenian languages
 Other Etruscan inscriptions:
 Liber Linteus
 Tabula Cortonensis

Notes

References
 Materials for the study of the Etruscan Language prepared by Murray Fowler and Richard George Wolfe
 
 
 
 Rix, Helmut (1985) "Sul testo del 'cippo di Perugia'" in Studi Etruschi 53 [1987], pp. 161-170.
  2 vols.

External links

 The Etruscan Texts Project A searchable database of Etruscan texts.

3rd-century BC steles
2nd-century BC steles
1822 archaeological discoveries
Etruscan inscriptions
Perugia
Steles